Anoplocapros is a genus of deepwater boxfishes native to the Indian and Pacific Oceans where they are found mostly around Australia.

Species
There are currently 3 recognized species in this genus:
 Anoplocapros amygdaloides Fraser-Brunner, 1941 (Western smooth boxfish)
 Anoplocapros inermis (Fraser-Brunner, 1935) (Eastern smooth boxfish)
 Anoplocapros lenticularis (J. Richardson, 1841) (White-barred boxfish)

References

Aracanidae
Taxa named by Johann Jakob Kaup
Marine fish genera